Terence John Sale (born 5 July 1951) is a New Zealand gymnast. He competed in seven events at the 1972 Summer Olympics.

References

1951 births
Living people
New Zealand male artistic gymnasts
Olympic gymnasts of New Zealand
Gymnasts at the 1972 Summer Olympics
Sportspeople from Auckland
Gymnasts at the 1978 Commonwealth Games
Commonwealth Games competitors for New Zealand